Boršt pri Dvoru is a settlement in the Municipality of Žužemberk in southeastern Slovenia. The area is part of the historical region of Lower Carniola. The municipality is now included in the Southeast Slovenia Statistical Region.

Name
The name of the settlement was changed from Boršt to Boršt pri Dvoru in 1955.

Cultural heritage
A small roadside chapel-shrine in the northern part of the village dates to 1851.

References

External links
Boršt pri Dvoru at Geopedia

Populated places in the Municipality of Žužemberk